AGV (initials for "Amisano Gino Valenza") is an Italian motorcycle helmet manufacturer active in motorcycle sport. Founded in 1947 by Gino Amisano, since 2007 the company is a subsidiary of Dainese, which was taken over by Investcorp in 2019. The AGV brand is well known in motorcycle sport.

Products 
AGV makes a range of motorcycle helmets, including full-face racing, sport, touring and off-road models to modular helmets, urban jet helmets and open-face cruiser designs, using various materials including carbon fiber, aramid, fiberglass, and thermoplastics.

Current AGV helmets are developed with an integrated technical development and construction approach the company calls the AGV Extreme Safety protocol, which AGV says has measurable benefits.

History 
AGV was founded in 1947 by Amisano Gino (1920–2009). The company name is the initials for Amisano Gino Valenza, Amisano's name and Valenza, the place the company was based. The AGV logo is the initials in a helmet shape, in the colors of the Italian flag.

AGV initially made leather seats and motorcycle saddles, adding leather motorcycle helmets a year later. Helmet production came to the fore for AGV when they started making fiberglass helmets in 1954. This was when AGV began making sponsorship deals with motorcycle racers including Kenny Roberts, Barry Sheene, Johnny Cecotto, Steve Baker, Angel Nieto, Giacomo Agostini, and Valentino Rossi.

In 1958 AGV began hanging advertising banners around the most-photographed track bends. An early example of product placement in movies was 1968's A Place for Lovers by De Sica.

AGV began sponsoring Formula One drivers such as Niki Lauda, Emerson Fittipaldi, Keke Rosberg, and Nelson Piquet in the early seventies. Valentino Rossi was made an honorary president of the company in 2008.

AGV Helmets was purchased by Italian sportswear and equipment company Dainese in July 2007. Dainese was acquired by Investcorp of Bahrain for €130 million in 2014 and by The Carlyle Group in 2022. In 2017, AGV began selling its first full-carbon modular helmet.

Niki Lauda 

During the 1976 Formula 1 Nürburgring race, the car of Niki Lauda (1949–2019) suddenly made a right turn and crashed into rocks. Lauda lost his AGV helmet and was belted in the car while the car and gasoline on the ground caught fire. The head mask was thinner in the areas usually covered by the helmet. Lauda was severely burnt especially on one side of his head. He survived the burns, with hurt lungs and broken bones.

In 2006 Lauda explained in an interview, that previously he always wore a helmet from Bell, but for the 1976 season AGV had developed a new more lightweight and comfortable helmet and Lauda tested it. The AGV helmet fitted too loosely. He believes that the Bell helmet would not have flown away.

Lauda was awarded a high compensation payment from AGV.

Research and innovations 
 1954 — First Italian fiberglass crash helmet
 1956 — First Jet crash helmet
 1958 — First company to use trackside advertising
 1967 — First Italian full-face helmet
 1977 — AGV sponsors the first racetrack Mobile Clinic
 2007 — AGV Extreme Standards integrated technical design and construction approach developed
 2012 — Begins selling first Extreme Standards helmets
 2017 – AGV Sportmodular, the first full-carbon sport modular helmet

Sponsorships 

AGV sponsors the following:

MotoGP 
  Valentino Rossi
  Jack Miller
  Franco Morbidelli
  Joan Mir
  Jorge Martin
  Luca Marini

Moto2 
  Lorenzo Baldassarri
  Marco Bezzecchi
  Nicolò Bulega

Moto3 
  Andrea Migno
  Niccolò Antonelli
  Celestino Vietti Ramus
  Dennis Foggia
  Gabriel Rodrigo

WSBK/ Supersport 
  Gabriele Ruiu

BSB 
  James Hillier
  Ryan Vickers
  Dan Linfoot

Motard 
  Thomas Chareyre

Legends 
 Niki Lauda
 Guy Martin
 Marco Lucchinelli
 Giacomo Agostini
 Troy Corser
 Manuel Poggiali
 Loris Capirossi
 Valentino Rossi

See also 

 List of Italian companies

References

External links 

 

Automotive companies of Italy
Helmet manufacturers
Sporting goods manufacturers of Italy
Italian brands
Manufacturing companies established in 1946
Companies based in Piedmont
Alessandria
Italian  companies established in 1946